Moments of Our Lives is the second live DVD from German futurepop band Blutengel. It was released as a double DVD and a limited edition featuring a CD of Moments of Our Lives.

Track listing

References

Blutengel albums
2008 live albums
2008 video albums
Live video albums